James Warren (born James Warren Taubman; July 29, 1930) is a magazine publisher and founder of Warren Publishing. Magazines published by Warren include Famous Monsters of Filmland, the horror-comics magazines Creepy, Eerie, and Vampirella, the war anthology Blazing Combat, and the science-fiction anthology 1984 (later renamed 1994), among others. Contributors to Warren’s magazines included such significant artists as Neal Adams, Richard Corben, Bernie Wrightson, Johnny Craig,  Reed Crandall, Steve Ditko, Frank Frazetta, Russ Heath, Esteban Maroto, Alex Niño, Sanjulián, John Severin, Tom Sutton, Angelo Torres, Al Williamson, and Wally Wood, and writers/editors including Archie Goodwin, Louise Jones, Don McGregor, and Doug Moench. He appointed Billy Graham as the first known African-American art director in mainstream, nationally distributed comic books/comics magazines.

Early life and education
James Warren was born at Mount Sinai Hospital in Philadelphia, Pennsylvania. An art student during his grammar school and high school years, he came in second one year in the Pennsylvania State Scholastic Art Competition. He attended the University of Pennsylvania School of Architecture and served in ROTC, leaving his junior year to enlist in the United States Army when the Korean war began. Accepted into Armored Infantry Officers Training, he was deafened six months later during training when he got too close to the .50 caliber heavy machine gun. He was medically discharged a few months later, and did not return to Penn.

After Hours and Famous Monsters of Filmland
In the 1950s, Warren worked in advertising as an artist and writer. Inspired by Hugh Hefner's magazine Playboy, he launched his own men's magazine, After Hours, which lasted four issues and led to his arrest on charges of obscenity and pornography in Philadelphia, Pennsylvania, where he was based. He recalled in an interview published in 1999:

Through After Hours, Warren met his future collaborator, Hollywood literary agent Forrest J Ackerman, who submitted the pictorial feature "Girls from Science-Fiction Movies." Following correspondence and telephone calls, they met in person in New York City in late 1957. There, Ackerman showed Warren a horror movie-themed issue of the French magazine Cinema 57. Recalling his youth seeing black-and-white horror movies in theaters, and realizing many of those movies were playing on television to a new generation of children, he was inspired to launch an accompanying magazine "carefully crafted to spoof the monsters and yet treat them as 'heroes' ... The adults wouldn't buy it, but the kids — those millions of Baby Boomers — would. A few weeks later I was in Forry Ackerman's living room in California, choosing the photos and article content for a one-shot magazine called Famous Monsters of Filmland, which went on sale that January with a February 1958 cover date." Warren said it sold out its 200,000 print run within days.

He financed the first issue, for which the upstate New York printer wanted payment upfront, through "some advance money from my distributor," Kable News,

A second issue was published eight months later "because I had to wait until the money came in from the first issue, and Kable wouldn't advance it to me." Warren said.

Warren moved to New York City in the 1960s, with his "Captain Company" (the mail-order service he concurrently founded to sell horror-related items in Famous Monsters of Filmland) remaining in Philadelphia, where overhead was cheaper. He found a duplex penthouse in midtown Manhattan where he lived on the top floor, using the ground floor living room, dining room, bath and kitchen as his "Warren Publishing" editorial office. By this time he was also publishing the magazines Wildest Westerns, Spacemen, and the satirical Help! During the first five years of those publications, his editorial assistants were future feminist icon Gloria Steinem, followed by future Monty Python's Flying Circus cartoonist Terry Gilliam.

Creepy and other comics magazines
In the mid-1960s, inspired by the EC Comics of the 1950s, Warren launched the black-and-white horror-comics magazines Creepy, Eerie and Vampirella. He continued to publish a variety of magazines until the 1980s, when he left the field due to health problems. In 2008, he established a new venture, Jim Warren Publishing.

References

Further reading
Bill Schelly. James Warren: Empire of Monsters. Seattle, Washington: Fantagraphics Books, 2019. 
Horror Biz Magazine #4, 1999

1930 births
American publishers (people)
Comic book publishers (people)
Living people